Riley, elevation , is an unincorporated community and census-designated place in McHenry County, Illinois, United States. It was named a CDP before the 2020 census, at which time it had a population of 10.

Geography
The community is located on the north side of the junction of Anthony Road, which runs east–west and Riley Road, which runs north–south. Both of these are Riley Township highways. In terms of geographic coordinates, the community is located at  (42.1914123, -88.6325924). In terms of the Public Land Survey System, Riley is found in the Northeast Quarter of Section 22, Township 43 North, Range 5 East of the Third Principal Meridian. The main branch of Coon Creek flows to the west of the community in a generally southeast to northwest direction, and a minor branch of the same creek flows from east to west to the north of the community. Riley is served by the Marengo, Illinois 60152 post office.

Demographics

2020 census

Points of interest
Riley Community Consolidated (K-8) School, District #18, 9406 Riley Road; the Riley Center Memorial Cemetery; old Riley Township Hall; and the Riley Township War Memorial.

See also
Riley Township

References 

Census-designated places in Illinois
Census-designated places in McHenry County, Illinois
Chicago metropolitan area